The year 668 BC was a year of the pre-Julian Roman calendar. In the Roman Empire, it was known as year 86 Ab urbe condita . The denomination 668 BC for this year has been used since the early medieval period, when the Anno Domini calendar era became the prevalent method in Europe for naming years.

Events

By Place

Middle East 

 King Ashurbanipal puts down an Egyptian rebellion. He drives out Egypt's Ethiopian king Taharqa, and restores Necho I as governor of Sais in the Nile Delta.
 Nineveh, capital of Assyria becomes the largest city of the world, taking the lead from Thebes in Egypt (estimation).
 Shamash-shum-ukin, second son of the late Assyrian king Esarhaddon, becomes king of Babylon.

Births

Deaths

References

 
660s BC